Euro Tower is a class A office building and the first Green building in Bucharest, awarded the BREEAM Post Construction Green Certificate.

See also
List of tallest buildings in Romania
List of tallest buildings in Bucharest

References

External links
Official site

Skyscraper office buildings in Bucharest
Office buildings completed in 2010